Vineland Cemetery is a cemetery in Vineland, Florida, and is one of the Lost Florida Cemeteries. It is just north of Interstate 4 along State Road 535 on Fenton Street. The name is not used much any more, since the City of Lake Buena Vista lies just to the south and west and is a more well-known name. Orange County officially calls the area Buena Vista North or Orange Center, its original name. The area was given the name Orange Center when it was platted in 1911. Previously it had the name Englewood, probably given to it by the Florida Midland Railroad. The name was changed to Vineland in 1924, supposedly due to confusion with Orange City, Florida. Vineland Cemetery was est. c. Reconstruction. Two Civil War veterans were buried at the cemetery. Later, it became known as Vineland Cemetery after 1924. In 1934 and 1936 Loma and John McGinnis were buried there, but later removed.

History of the Vineland Cemetery
This is one of the lost cemeteries in Orange County.
The cemetery was in a wooded area but now is gated off and sits in the rear of a Publix Supermarket parking lot. The cemetery is marked with an obelisk, and the Civil War veterans’ headstones.  

Vineland (town):

MCGINNIS, John, b. Jan 17 1868 d. May 25, 1936, Age 68 * and
MCGINNIS, Loma, b. Apr 17 1897 d. Jun 15 1934, Age 37 *

American Civil War:

LUDWIG, Corp. W,  b. 1839 d. C. Reconstruction, Co. M In Y.T.A and
FOSTER, Chas H, b. 1827 d. C. Reconstruction, Co B, 3 Mass. Cav.

Long time Vineland residents have confirmed that these four names were here.
Two McGinnis metal markers were surrounded by a low wire fence but have deteriorated
and are unreadable.  (information is from an earlier survey LDS Survey in 1956 -
FHC# 0002104).  Ludwig and Foster stones are flat and about 50 feet away.
The graves of McGinnis are no longer present as they have been moved by the family. The Civil War graves are still present though are planned to be moved to a United States National Cemetery.

Graves
Corp. Washington Ludwig

Corporal Washington Ludwig is one of two soldiers that were buried at the Vineland Cemetery in Vineland, Florida. Ludwig was born in New York in 1839 and died in Florida. He was in Battery M. 1st New York Regiment of Light Artillery. He did not die in the war but did later on in Florida.

Charles H. Foster

Charles H. Foster is one of two soldiers buried at the Vineland Cemetery in Vineland, Florida. Foster was born in 1827 in Massachusetts. In the American Civil War he fought, but not in Florida. He later moved there and passed in the early 1900s.

The McGinnis' Graves

Two McGinnis family graves were buried there and later moved by the family. John and Loma McGinnis were buried and died in Vineland. John McGinnis was born January 17, 1868, and died May 25, 1936, at age 68. Loma MCGINNIS was born April 17, 1897, and died June 15, 1934, at age 37. The graves were marked by two metal markers, but they were diminished by natural mechanisms.

Other Graves

No other graves have yet been found at this cemetery, but there still is a possibility graves may be hidden or unmarked as years ago there was no fence and a great amount of Florida Scrub.

Restoration

The restoration of the cemetery itself is complete. With grass, mulch and floral arrangements as well as a ceremony to top it off. It used to be full of weeds and brush; it was also desecrated twice. Repairs to its fence and a new coat of paint has been added to the fading fence. Eagle Scout Marshall Polston, BSA Troop 6, and the Sons of Union Veterans of the Civil War have funded and run the restoration. Until the area is developed into a park that will surround the cemetery in a few years, it is off limits to all people excepting all authorized personnel: The owners, Sons of Union Veterans of the Civil War Officials, and authorized Scouts from BSA Troop 6. The fence is chained up and locked; however, people may view the cemetery outside the fence and gate on or near the designated paths to pay their respects.

Related links

Vineland, Florida

American Civil War

Florida

References

http://www.fl-genweb.org/orange/cemeteries.html

http://www.fl-genweb.org/orange/Cemeteries/Vineland/VinelandLocation.html

http://americancivilwar.com/

http://www.deathindexes.com/florida/index.html

http://www.stateofflorida.com/Portal/DesktopDefault.aspx?tabid=13

http://www.ancestry.com/

https://www.findagrave.com/cemetery/2404599/vineland-cemetery

https://cfgs.org/local-resources/cemetery-survey-introduction/cemetery-list/?id=138

https://orlando-fl.alluschurches.com/vineland-cemetery/

http://genealogytrails.com/fla/orange/cem_vineland.html

http://www.c4dofsuvcw.org/vinelandeventphotos.html

Cemeteries in Florida
Protected areas of Orange County, Florida